Landsbankinn (literally "the National bank"), originally NBI hf., is an Icelandic bank headquartered in Reykjavík. It was established in 2008 by the Icelandic government out of the domestic operations of its predecessor Landsbanki which failed during the 2008–2011 Icelandic financial crisis. It is the largest bank in Iceland and the history of its predecessor goes back to 1885. In 2022 the bank had 35 branches around Iceland. The bank has around 39% market share in the retail market and around 34% in the corporate banking market (2022).

History 
NBI hf. was created 9 October 2008, after the government had taken control of the insolvent Landsbanki two days earlier and decided to split all domestic operations into this new surviving version of the bank, while leaving the remaining foreign operations of Landsbanki for bankruptcy and winding-up proceedings. The total assets value declined roughly to a third for the new bank, when comparing to the previous size for the old version of the bank. The number of employees were also reduced from 2770 in 2007, to only 1233 in 2012.

In April 2011, the legal name was changed from NBI hf. to Landsbankinn hf. The bank has been mostly state owned since its establishment. In December 2009, the Icelandic State Treasury owned 81.33% of the shares and the remaining 18.67% of the shares were owned by (Landsskil). In April 2013, the Icelandic State Treasury acquired 16.67% of Landsskil's shares and thus the Treasury owned 98% of the shares while Landsbankinn received 2% of own shares, or 500 million shares. The Bank received the shares from LBI hf. with the obligation to allocate them to employees. In September 2013, 317 million own shares were allocated to employees, of which employees received 119 million shares and 198 million of own shares were repurchased by the Bank for settlement of tax obligations and pension liabilities. The allocation of the remainder of the own shares was completed in February 2014. In 2022 the Icelandic State Treasury owned 98.2% of the shares, the bank owned 1.6% and the remainder were owned by less than 900 other investors.

See also 

 List of banks in Iceland

References

External links 

  
 landsbankinn.com 
 Mobile site

Banks of Iceland
Banks established in 2008
Companies based in Reykjavík
2008 establishments in Iceland

de:Landsbanki